Pugachev is a 1978 historical drama film, directed by Alexey Saltykov and starring Yevgeny Matveyev and Vija Artmane. The film was honored with a special prize at All-Union Film Festival in 1979.

Plot
Don Cossack Yemelyan Pugachev says goodbye to his wife and children and goes to run. The elder Filaret blesses him to lead a rebellion under the name of Peter III of Russia. The insurgents dealt with the feudal lords cruelly. Queen Catherine the Great directs troops against the rioters. Traitors betray Yemelyan, and now he is being transported across Russia in an iron cage.

Main cast
Yevgeny Matveyev as Yemelyan Pugachev
Vija Artmane as Catherine the Great
Tamara Syomina as Sofia Pugachyeva
Olga Prokhorova as Ustinya Pugachyeva
Pyotr Glebov as Stepan Fedulov
Boris Kudryavtsev as Maksim Shigayev (voiced by Stanislav Chekan)
Grigore Grigoriu as Chika Zarubin (voiced by Vladimir Ferapontov)
Viktor Pavlov as Mitka Lysov
Boris Kulikov as Andrei Ovchinnikov
Konstantin Zakharchenko as Ivan Tvorogov
Fyodor Odinokov as Khlopusha
Mikhail Zlatopolsky as deacon
Vatslav Dvorzhetsky as Filaret
Salavat Kireyev as Salawat Yulayev
Boris Plotnikov as icon painter
Igor Gorbachyov as Nikita Panin
Anatoly Azo as Grigory Orlov (voiced by Vladimir Druzhnikov)
Vilnis Bekeris as Johann von Michelsohnen
Sergei Golovanov as Petr Panin
Alexander Zhdanov as Paul I of Russia
Fyodor Nikitin as valet

References

External links

Yemelyan Pugachev at the Kino-teatr.ru

1970s biographical drama films
Soviet biographical drama films
Russian biographical drama films
1970s Russian-language films
1970s historical drama films
Soviet historical drama films
Russian historical drama films
Films set in the 1770s
Films set in Russia
Mosfilm films
Films directed by Alexey Saltykov

Cultural depictions of Catherine the Great
Cultural depictions of Paul I of Russia
Films about the Russian Empire